Thomas (died sometime after 1211) was an Augustinian canon and Cistercian monk in 13th-century Scotland. According to Walter Bower Thomas was sub-prior of St Andrews Cathedral Priory  when he became prior of St Andrews, sometime in 1199.  He appears as prior in contemporary documents for the first time on 6 June 1199.

According to Bower, he was more pious than most of the brother canons and, being alienated and dissatisfied with their lax lifestyles, resigned his office to become a Cistercian novice at Coupar Angus Abbey. This probably happened in 1211. His successor was Prior Simon.

Notes

References

 
 

12th-century births
13th-century deaths
Scottish Cistercians
13th-century Scottish Roman Catholic priests
Priors of St Andrews